Bid Korduiyeh (also Romanized as Bīd Kordūīyeh; also known as Bīdkordoeeyeh) is a village in Fathabad Rural District, in the Central District of Baft County, Kerman Province, Iran. At the 2006 census, its population was 495, in 127 families.

References 

Populated places in Baft County